Lewsor (alternately, in Leet: L3WS0R) is the moniker of Mathieu Gosselin, a Digital Hardcore artist previously of Extasick. Lewsor put Extasick on hiatus to pursue his solo career.

Discography 

Rather Die Than Hear That (What a Fake! Records, 2005)
No Error (Audiotrauma, 2009)

External links 
Official website
Free download of '...And This Dirty Musick'

French punk rock groups